Buddy Myers  (May 14, 1906 – July 25, 1967)  was an American sound engineer. He was nominated for an Academy Award in the category Sound Recording for the film The Brave One. He worked on over 100 films between 1929 and 1967.

Selected filmography
 The Brave One (1956)

References

External links

1906 births
1967 deaths
American audio engineers
People from Richmond, Virginia
Engineers from Virginia
20th-century American engineers